Egon Oehri (born 23 January 1940) was a Liechtenstein-born athlete who competed at the 1960 Summer Olympics. He raced in two events, the 800m and the 1,500m. In the 800m he ran a time of 2:00.49, which put him in sixth place of heat five. He did not finish (DNF) in the 1,500m (heat 2) and his Personal Best for that event is unknown.

Liechtenstein entered five athletes for these games. Along with him competing in athletics was Alois Büchel.

References

Olympic athletes of Liechtenstein
Living people
Liechtenstein male middle-distance runners
Athletes (track and field) at the 1960 Summer Olympics
1940 births